Roza Sarkisian, (born 20 January 1987) is a Ukrainian theatre director and curator.

Biography 

She studied Political Sociology at the National University of Kharkiv. She graduated in Directing the Kharkiv National University of Arts in 2012. 

In her Kharkiv artistic period she was the founder and artistic director of the independent De Facto Theatre (2012-2017), where she directed the play "Yes my Führer" by Brigitte Schwaiger, performance VO(Y)NA, post-documentary play Museum of Peace. Museum of War, To Kill Woman and others productions.

In the years of 2017-2019 Roza worked as the Chief Director Theatre Director of the First Ukrainian Academic Theatre for Children and Youth in Lviv. She  worked in Lviv with Polish dramaturge Joanna Wichowska on the production of Beautiful, Beautiful, Beautiful Times Times. 

In the years of 2017-2019  she was a Staff Director on the House in Ivano-Frankivsk National Academic Drama and Music Theatre.

She also worked with the Theatre Powszechny in Warsaw (2021), Lesia Ukrainka  Academic Theatre in Lviv (2020), Kyiv Academic Theatre Actor (2018),  Kharkiv Theatre for Children and Youth in Kharkiv, Municipal Theatre (2015), the Russian Academic Youth Theatre in Moscow (2013), the Udmurt Academic Theatre of Russian Drama (2013). 

In 2020 she staged post-documentary performance based on the experiences of actors and actresses and inspired by motifs from Shakespeare's Hamlet and Heiner Müller's Hamletmachine H-effect. During the COVID-19 pandemic in Ukraine, Sarkisian directed productions which premiered online. 

In 2021 she directed a production of KOLO-BO-RACIO which worked with young people and actors with disabilities.

Among her recent most applauded works are: Yes, my Fuhrer (Theatre DeFacto, 2014), the My Granddad was digging. My Dad was digging. But I Won't Do It (Ukrainian-Polish co-production, co-director: Agnieszka Błońska, 2016); Theory of the Big Filter (Theatre of the Contemporary Dialog, Poltava, 2017); Psychosis (Theatre Actor in Kyiv, 2018); Wonderful, Wonderful, Wonderful Times (the First Theatre in Lviv, 2018); and Macbeth (Academic Lesia Ukrainka Drama Theatre in Lviv, 2019), H-effect based on Hamlet by Shakeaspeare and Hamletmaschine by Heiner Muller (Ukraine-Polish-German co-production, NGO “Art-Dialogue”, 2020), Radio Mariia by Joanna Wichowska and Krysia Bednarek (Theatre Powszechny in Warsaw, 2022)

Her productions, dealing with the topics of collective memory, national identity, political manipulation, non-normativity and social oppression have won several awards and invitations to many festivals in Ukraine (including Gogol Fest in Kyiv , 2014 and 2016; Urban Exploration Lviv Fest 2014; GaliciaKult in Kharkiv, 2016; Terra Futura in Kherson, 2016; Startup Gogol Fest in Mariupol 2017; the Golden Lion in Lviv, 2018; Parade Fest in Kharkiv, 2018 and 2019; Svitohliad in Severodonieck, 2019) and in Poland: Desant.UA Festival in Warsaw, 2017; Close Strangers Festival in Poznań, 2019.

Awards 
Roza is a winner of the British Council Ukraine competition "Taking the Stage 2017", as well as the Gaude Polonia scholarship of the Minister of Culture and National Heritage of the Republic of Poland in 2017, International Mobility Grant “Culture Bridges” and the Artistic Scholarship from the President of Ukraine in 2019/2020. She also won a "City of Lviv Personality of the Year 2018” award in the category of Theatre.

References

External links 
 
 
 H-effect  (YouTube)
 Podcast: Taking the Stage — Роза Саркісян 

Living people
Ukrainian theatre directors
People from Stepanakert
National University of Kharkiv alumni
1987 births
Women theatre directors
Nagorno-Karabakh
Women writers (modern period)
Ukrainian writers